Myrtille Georges (born 21 December 1990) is a French former tennis player.

She has career-high WTA rankings of 168 in singles (achieved on 18 July 2016) and world No. 287 in doubles (21 August 2017). She won nine singles and six doubles titles on the ITF Women's World Tennis Tour.

Career
Georges made her debut on the ITF Women's Circuit in November 2006 at a $10k event in Le Havre; she only played in the singles draw and was eliminated in the second round of qualifying. Her next stop was in November 2007 at a $50k tournament in Deauville, France (it was the only tournament that she played in 2007); she only played the singles event and was eliminated in the qualifying first round.

In 2008, she played the singles events of five tournaments (all of them in France and four of them in the last four months of the year) on the ITF Circuit.

From 2009 onwards, Georges started to play more regularly; she played in the singles events of 23 tournaments on the 2009 ITF Circuit.

She made her WTA Tour doubles debut at the 2010 Internationaux de Strasbourg after receiving a main-draw wildcard; she and her partner Émilie Bacquet lost in the first round to the top-seeded pair of Chuang Chia-jung and Lucie Hradecká, 1–6, 3–6.

Georges made her WTA Tour singles debut at the 2011 Open GdF Suez also thanks to a wildcard; she lost in the first round of qualifying to Maria-Elena Camerin, 3–6, 3–6.

Making her Grand Slam singles main-draw debut at the 2016 French Open after obtaining a wildcard, she was eliminated in the first or second singles qualifying rounds of the French Open for four consecutive years, from 2012 (the year of her Grand Slam singles debut) to 2015. In the first round of the 2016 French Open, she defeated world No. 67, Christina McHale, 6–7, 6–0, 6–3, to register her first career-win over a player ranked in the top 100 of the WTA singles rankings, before losing in the second round to the No. 4 seed Garbiñe Muguruza, 2–6, 0–6 in 53 minutes.

She announced her retirement from professional tennis in September 2020.

Grand Slam performance timeline

Singles

ITF Circuit finals

Singles: 23 (9 titles, 14 runner–ups)

Doubles: 8 (6 titles, 2 runner–ups)

References

External links
 
 

1990 births
Living people
French female tennis players
Sportspeople from Manche